The 2002 Iowa Hawkeyes football team represented the University of Iowa during the 2002 NCAA Division I-A football season. The Hawkeyes played their home games at Kinnick Stadium in Iowa City, Iowa and were led by head coach Kirk Ferentz.

Iowa finished the regular-season with an 11–1 record, and were unbeaten in Big Ten Conference games at 8–0. The one loss came to rival Iowa State. With all the regular season success, which included a Co-Big Ten championship, the Hawkeyes could do little right in the 2003 Orange Bowl and lost 38-17 to the USC Trojans. Despite the loss, the 11 wins established an Iowa record for wins in a single season (matched in 2009, surpassed in 2015).

Preseason
Coming off a 7–5 season that included an Alamo Bowl victory over Texas Tech, things were looking up for the Iowa Hawkeyes. However, the Hawkeyes had to replace six offensive starters and four defensive starters. Quarterback Brad Banks and running back Fred Russell looked to take a much bigger role in the offense. Russell would ultimately secure the starting spot as junior Aaron Greving decided to quit the team. Tight end Dallas Clark would also play a big role in the passing game.

On defense, the Hawkeyes lost all-conference defensive tackle Aaron Kampman, but had three players – Fred Barr, Benny Sapp, and Bob Sanders – on the Nagurski watch list.  However, on August 5, 2002 Benny Sapp was arrested for disorderly conduct, resisting arrest and public intoxication leading to his being kicked off the team before the season started and his eventual transfer to the University of Northern Iowa and leaving the Hawkeyes very thin at cornerback. In total, Iowa returned six defensive starters as opposed to only five offensive starters. The Hawkeyes also returned punter David Bradley and kicker Nate Kaeding.

For lack of experience on offense, the Hawkeyes were unranked in both polls to start the season. They were also picked by Sports Illustrated to have a season similar to the year before, saying that another trip to the Alamo Bowl "should be viewed as a success."

Schedule

Roster

Rankings

Game summaries

Akron

Source: Box Score 
    
    
    
    
    
    
    
    
    
    
    
    
    

Iowa’s offense proved unstoppable as Fred Russell and Jermelle Lewis combined for 293 of the Hawkeyes' 376 rushing yards. Quarterback Brad Banks was steady in his debut, completing five of his eight passes, two for touchdowns. Wide receiver Mo Brown was on the receiving end of both of Banks' touchdowns. The defense was suspect at times (nearly 300 passing yards by Akron), but linebacker Kevin Worthy picked up the slack with a 72-yard fumble return for a touchdown. Iowa's 37 points in the first quarter was a school record for points in a single quarter.

at Miami (OH)

Source: Box Score 
    
    
    
    
    
    
    
    
    
    

Facing a Ben Roethlisberger-led Miami squad, the Hawkeyes struggled to a five-point victory. Fred Russell ran for over 100 yards for the second straight week and Mo Brown caught five passes for 115 yards and one touchdown. Banks went head-to-head with Roethlisberger, throwing for 256 yards. Roethlisberger passed the ball 51 times, and completed 33 of them for 343 yards but had two interceptions. Capitalizing on several Iowa mistakes, the RedHawks were in the game late into the fourth quarter but could not pull off the upset at home.

Iowa State

Source: Box Score 
    
    
    
    
    
    
    
    
    
    
    
    

Having not beaten their in-state rivals in the four previous seasons, the Hawkeyes quickly grabbed a 17-point halftime lead. But Iowa State's Seneca Wallace was not about to leave Iowa City with a loss. Coupled with two Banks fumbles in Iowa territory, a stellar performance by the senior quarterback led to 29 straight Iowa State points. Despite holding Iowa State to 85 yards rushing, Iowa's last touchdown was a little too late, and the Cyclones ran out the clock after Iowa failed an onside kick attempt.

Utah State

Source: Box Score 
    
    
    
    
    
    
    
    
    

For the second straight week, the Hawkeyes held a 24–7 advantage at halftime. But this time, the Hawks did all the scoring in the 3rd quarter to salt the game away. Iowa was without starting running back Fred Russell but Jermelle Lewis did an excellent job in replacement. The sophomore had 109 yards on only 9 rushes. The Hawkeyes also got scores off a blocked punt by Sean Considine recovered by Mike Follett and a fumble recovery by Jared Clauss. As a team, the Hawkeyes racked up exactly 300 yards rushing and 518 yards of total offense.

at No. 12 Penn State

Source: Box Score 
    
    
    
    
    
    
    
    
    
    
    
    
    

Iowa opened up Big Ten play against the #12 team in the country, the Penn State Nittany Lions. On the heels of three quick touchdowns and one field goal, the Hawkeyes opened up the game with an unexpected 23–0 lead. When Penn State finally got on the scoreboard, Iowa quickly answered back with a Nate Kaeding 55-yard field goal as time expired in the first half. Holding a 35–13 lead going into the 4th quarter, things were looking ripe for a Hawkeye upset. But Penn State quarterback Zack Mills had the game of his career and threw three touchdown passes in the final 7:13 to tie the game at 35. Mills had a total of 399 passing yards in the game. However, Penn State was not able to answer an Iowa touchdown in the first overtime and, for the first time since 1996, Iowa had beaten a ranked opponent on the road. The win vaulted the Hawkeyes into the AP Top 25 for the first time since 1997.

Purdue

Source: Box Score 
    
    
    
    
    
    
    
    
    

In a game that was full of big plays, Iowa did just enough to win on Homecoming weekend. Iowa scored three times on special teams, once on a blocked field goal, once on a blocked punt and once on a 51-yard Nate Kaeding field goal. But even a 95-yard touchdown pass from Brad Banks to Dallas Clark wasn't enough to keep the Boilermakers from making a comeback. Scoring on two rushing touchdowns in the 4th quarter, Purdue quickly turned a 10-point deficit into a four-point lead. And after Banks was sacked on 4th down with only 2:44 remaining, it seemed as if Purdue would escape with the victory. But the Boilermakers could do nothing with their three downs and had to punt the ball away. Banks wasted no time, running for a 44-yard gain to the Purdue 43 on the first play of the drive. Later, on 4th down from the Purdue seven-yard line, Banks connected with Clark once again, this time for the game-winning touchdown. Purdue had one last chance, but a late interception by Adolphus Shelton secured the Iowa victory.

Michigan State

Source: Box Score 
    
    
    
    
    
    
    
    
    
    
    

Iowa's defense was strong against Michigan State, as the Hawkeyes held the Spartans to just 249 yards of total offense. No one really stood out on offense, but the Hawkeyes once again got scores from the defense and the special teams. Immediately following a Spartan touchdown, Iowa's Jermelle Lewis returned the kick 94 yards for the touchdown. Later in the 1st quarter, Derek Pagel took an interception 62 yards for the touchdown. C.J. Jones scored twice on passes from Brad Banks as Iowa scored 44 consecutive points spanning the first three quarters. Iowa also held Michigan State's Charles Rogers from scoring a touchdown, ending Rogers' consecutive game streak with a touchdown reception at 14.

at Indiana

Source: Box Score 
    
    
    
    
    
    
    

Running back Fred Russell was the star on offense, running for 110 yards and two touchdowns. But aside from Grant Steen's three interceptions and the eight points allowed, the defense was not up to par. The Hawkeyes allowed 480 yards of total offense, including 334 yards passing by Indiana's Gibran Hamdan. The Hawkeyes also made several mental errors by fumbling the ball twice while Brad Banks threw a rare interception. The game could have been much closer had Steen not intercepted all three passes deep in Iowa territory. The three interceptions is also an Iowa single-game record.

at No. 8 Michigan

Source: Box Score 
    
    
    
    
    
    
    
    

Behind a solid effort from running back Jermelle Lewis and wide receiver C.J. Jones, the Hawkeyes quickly jumped out to a 10–0 lead. And if it were not for a fumbled punt, the game wouldn't have gotten any closer. As it was, Michigan's Chris Perry scored moments later and Iowa took a 10–6 lead into halftime. After a Michigan field goal pushed the score to 10–9, Iowa took over. The Hawkeyes scored 24 unanswered points to finish the game as Lewis and Jones racked up two touchdowns each. Quarterback Brad Banks threw for 222 yards and three touchdowns as Iowa handed Michigan their worst home loss since 1967. The win propelled the Hawkeyes into the AP Top 10 for the first time since the 1991 season.

Wisconsin

Source: Box Score 
    
    
    
    
    

Quarterback Brad Banks threw for a career-high 275 yards while the Hawkeye defense held the Badgers to just 78 yards rushing. In total, Wisconsin had 215 yards of offense. Iowa's Mo Brown and Dallas Clark finished with a combined 204 receiving yards and had both of Iowa's touchdowns. As a result of Iowa's powerful defense, Wisconsin lost two quarterbacks to injury, Brooks Bollinger and Jim Sorgi. Iowa's defense also held running back Anthony Davis to a career-low 34 yards on 16 rushes. After the victory, Iowa was 6–0 in the Big Ten for the first time in school history.

Northwestern

Source: Box Score 
    
    
    
    
    
    
    
    
    
    
    

On Senior Day, Brad Banks was a perfect 10-for-10 for 197 yards and three touchdowns. He also scored on two of Iowa's four rushing touchdowns. Iowa's receivers were busy as Mo Brown, Dallas Clark and C.J. Jones all had touchdowns. Freshman wideout Ed Hinkel even got in on the action, scoring on a 58-yard punt return. Running back Fred Russell returned from a hand injury, and ran for 100 yards in becoming Iowa's 10th player to have a 1,000-yard rushing season. Iowa's victory tied a school record for wins in a season at 10.

at Minnesota

Source: Box Score 
    
    
    
    
    
    
    
    
    
    

Iowa's defense forced six Minnesota turnovers en route to a 45–21 victory. The Hawkeyes only had 100 yards passing, mainly because their running game couldn't be stopped. Fred Russell and Jermelle Lewis combined for 295 of Iowa's 365 rushing yards while Brad Banks threw for two touchdowns and ran for two touchdowns. Mo Brown caught his tenth touchdown pass of the season, which tied Quinn Early for touchdown receptions in a season. The win was Iowa's tenth straight Big Ten win, the longest such streak since a 13-game streak in the 1920s. The game was also played in front of the largest crowd to ever see a Minnesota Golden Gophers football game at the Metrodome.

vs. No. 5 USC (Orange Bowl)

Source: Box Score 
    
    
    
    
    
    
    
    
    

The game opened up with a bang for the Hawkeyes, as C.J. Jones took the opening kickoff 100-yards for the touchdown. But as it turns out, it would be the only time until late in the fourth quarter that the Hawkeyes would see the endzone. Although the game was tied at halftime, USC blocked Iowa's last-second field goal, preventing a possible Iowa lead at the half. From there, Heisman winner Carson Palmer went to work. The senior quarterback threw for over 300 yards against the Big Ten's worst passing defense and led scoring drives of 79, 80, 99, 85 and 61 yards as the Trojans held a 16-minute advantage in time of possession. The USC defense was suffocating and Iowa's miscues were proof. The Hawkeyes had two turnovers, 13 penalties, and multiple missed opportunities.

Postseason Awards
Kirk Ferentz – Named Big Ten Coach of the Year, Walter Camp Coach of the Year, and AP College Football Coach of the Year.
Brad Banks – Big Ten Offensive Player of the Year, AP Player of the Year, Davey O'Brien Award winner and second in Heisman Trophy voting. Also received first-team All-American honors along with USC's Carson Palmer and Miami's Ken Dorsey.
Nate Kaeding – Winner of the Lou Groza Award, presented to the nation's best kicker. Also received first-team All-American honors along with Ohio State kicker Mike Nugent.
Dallas Clark – Winner of the John Mackey Award, given to the nation's best tight end. Consensus first-team All-American.
Eric Steinbach – Big Ten Offensive Lineman of the Year and Consensus First-team All-American.
Bruce Nelson – First-team All-American honors.

Team Players in the 2003 NFL Draft

References

Iowa
Iowa Hawkeyes football seasons
Big Ten Conference football champion seasons
Iowa Hawkeyes football